The Benton Spirit is a community newspaper for "informing, enhancing, showcasing, promoting, and educating" residents of southwest Michigan and northern Indiana.  It is published weekly on Thursday.

Notes

External links
Benton Spirit website

Newspapers published in Michigan
Benton Harbor, Michigan